John Francis William Gray (17 August 1885 – 23 May 1950) was an Australian rules footballer who played with Geelong in the Victorian Football League (VFL).

Notes

External links 

1885 births
1950 deaths
Australian rules footballers from Victoria (Australia)
Geelong Football Club players
Ballarat Imperial Football Club players